Reibnitz may refer to:

Günther von Reibnitz (1894–1983), a German cavalry officer
Karl Gustav Hans Otto Freiherr von Reibnitz, a minister-president of the Free State of Mecklenburg-Strelitz
Princess Michael of Kent (born 1945), a member of the British royal family, born Baroness Marie Christine von Reibnitz
Rybnica, Jelenia Góra County, a Polish village known as Reibnitz in German

See also
Rybnica (disambiguation)